Brotherhood and unity was a popular slogan of the League of Communists of Yugoslavia that was coined during the Yugoslav People's Liberation War (1941–45), and which evolved into a guiding principle of Yugoslavia's post-war inter-ethnic policy. In Slovenia, the slogan "Brotherhood and Peace" was used in the beginning.

History
After the invasion of Yugoslavia by the Axis powers in April 1941, the occupying powers and their helpers sought to systematically incite hatred among the many national, ethnic and religious groups of Yugoslavia. The Yugoslav Communist Party successfully publicized the brotherhood and unity of Yugoslavia's nations (narodi) and national minorities (nacionalne manjine, later renamed to narodnosti) in their struggle against the fascist enemy and domestic collaborators. The decision of the second session of AVNOJ on the federalization of Yugoslavia in 1943 was regarded as the recognition of this Brotherhood and Unity principle.

After the war, the slogan designated the official policy of inter-ethnic relations in the Socialist Federal Republic of Yugoslavia, as embodied in its federal constitutions of 1963 and of 1974. The policy prescribed that Yugoslavia's nations (Serbs, Macedonians, Croats, Slovenes, Montenegrins, Bosniaks) and national minorities (Albanians, Hungarians, Romanians, Bulgarians, Jews, Italians, Ukrainians and others) are equal groups that coexist peacefully in the federation, promoting their similarities and interdependence in order to overcome national conflicts and hatred. Every individual was entitled to the expression of their own culture, while the ethnic groups had an oath to one another to maintain peaceful relations.  Citizens were also encouraged and allowed to declare their nationality as Yugoslav, which usually polled at 10%. The policy also led to the adoption of national quota systems in all public institutions, including economic organizations, in which national groups were represented by their republic's or province's national composition.

Throughout Yugoslavia many factories, schools, public venues, folklore ensembles and sporting teams used to be named "Brotherhood and unity", as well as the Ljubljana–Zagreb–Belgrade–Skopje highway (Brotherhood and Unity Highway). The country had a decoration called the Order of the Brotherhood and Unity.

Several prominent persons from former Yugoslavia were convicted for activities deemed to threaten the brotherhood and unity, such as acts of chauvinist propaganda, separatism and irredentism. Among them were Serbian convicted war criminal Vojislav Šešelj, former presidents of Bosnia and Herzegovina (Alija Izetbegović) and Croatia (Franjo Tuđman and Stjepan Mesić), Croatian army general of Albanian descent Rahim Ademi and many others. One Kosovar Albanian, Adem Demaçi, was imprisoned for almost 30 years for allegations of espionage and irredentism.

Notes

References

Josip Broz Tito
League of Communists of Yugoslavia
National mottos
Politics of Yugoslavia
Political catchphrases
Socialist Federal Republic of Yugoslavia
Ethnicity in politics
Community building
Multiculturalism in Europe